is a Japanese historic term referring to visually-impaired Japanese women, most of whom worked as musicians.

Etymology 
The ideographs for  mean "blind" and "woman."

Organizations 
From the Edo period (1600–1868), goze organized themselves in a number of ways. Few large-scale organizations have been found in urban areas, though during the nineteenth century some documents speak of a goze association in the city of Edo. In Osaka and some regional towns, goze were sometimes informally linked to pleasure quarters, where they were called to perform their songs at parties.

Goze organizations developed most in rural areas and continued to exist in Niigata (once known as Echigo) and Nagano prefectures well into the twentieth century (the last important active goze, died in 2005 at age 105).

From the Edo period onward, other goze groups were found from Kyushu in the south to the Yamagata and Fukushima prefectures in the north. Large and important groups were especially active in the Kantō and surrounding areas, in what are today Gunma, Saitama, Chiba, Shizuoka, Yamanashi, and Tokyo-to. Other groups were formed in the Nagano and Gifu prefectures, and the Aichi prefecture farther south. In addition to the well-known groups of Niigata prefecture, groups existed in other areas along the western seaboard, including Toyama, Ishikawa, and Fukui prefectures.

Suzuki Shōei (1996 and elsewhere) divides the organizations of Echigo goze into three main types:
 goze organizations such as the one in Takada (today the city of Jōetsu), in which a limited number of goze houses (17 in the early twentieth-century) were concentrated in the city and in which each house was led by a master teacher who passed on the rights to her position and property to her top (or favorite) student after her death. Girls who wished to become goze had to move to the city and enter the house (fictitious family) of the goze teacher. Sometimes they were adopted by the teacher as a daughter.
 Organizations such as the one centered on Nagaoka, in which goze remained in the countryside and often their own home, after completing their apprenticeship with a goze elsewhere. These goze teachers were loosely linked to one another by their relation to the goze head in Nagaoka (a position assumed by a goze who, after becoming the head, assumed the name Yamamoto Goi). They deliberated on what to do about members who had broken rules, ate a celebratory meal, and performed for one another.
 Organizations such as the one found in Iida (Nagano prefecture), in which the position of head rotated among members.

Rules
Goze organizations existed to allow blind women a degree of independence in pursuing their careers as musicians (or in some cases, massage). The rules that governed Echigo goze were said to have been decreed by ancient emperors, but no copy of these rules earlier than the late seventeenth century have been found. The central rules governing goze behavior was to obey teachers, be humble towards donors, and not engage in activities that might contravene the morality of the feudal society in which goze operated. Although not stipulated in detail, perhaps the most important rule was celibacy. If such an offense was detected, it easily resulted in the expulsion of a goze from the group. These stipulations were made and enforced for several reasons: if a goze did have a lover or if she married, she would have financial support from an outside source, and thus needed no further charity. Furthermore, the stipulations were developed to protect the image of the goze group as a legitimate non-profit organization and protect it from the appearing to be, or devolving into, a prostitution ring.

Rules were also necessary in part because many goze spent a good part of the year on the road, touring from village to village and depending on farmers to allow them to spend the night and use their houses as makeshift concert halls. Reputation and recognition as an officially sanctioned, upright occupation was thus of great importance in making the career of the goze possible. In addition, because Edo-period society was rife with discrimination against women, itinerants, musicians, and anyone with a visual disability, membership in an association that was recognized as legitimate and honorable was an important credential which allayed suspicions that the woman might be a wandering vagabond or prostitute. Honjō Hidetarō (born 1945) and Kosugi Makiko (born circa 1940) were two of many renowned professional folk song performers who, in their childhoods, were criticized by their parents for "acting like goze".

Songs
The repertory of most goze has been lost, but songs of goze from the Niigata, Nagano, Saitama, and Kagoshima prefectures have been recorded. The vast majority of these recordings are from what is today Niigata prefecture.

The repertory of Niigata (Echigo) goze can be divided into several distinct categories:
 : Long strophic songs in a 7-5 syllable meter, often based on archaic tales and sometimes with a Buddhist message. The melody to which these texts were sung was most likely a variant of the Echigo folk song . These songs were probably created during the eighteenth century, though elements of the texts are far older. They were usually only transmitted from one goze to another.
 : Long strophic songs in a 7-7- syllable meter. Texts usually feature double love-suicides or other melodramatic themes. The melody to which these texts were sung is a variant of the Echigo folk song .  did not appear until the mid-nineteenth century. Although they were a highly typical goze song, they were sometimes also sung by other types of performers.
 : A functional designation applying to any song used by goze as they made their way from door to door collecting donations. Goze usually sang whatever inhabitants of a given area wished to hear, but in the Niigata goze repertory, some unique songs were used exclusively for such purposes.
 : Rural songs, usually with no known composer, learned by the populace informally. Many types of folk songs constituted an important part of the goze repertory, and were especially useful in livening up parties when goze were summoned to perform.
Such songs were often learned from professional musicians outside the goze community.
 To please their customers, goze would also sing various popular songs.

See also
 Lady Saigo
 Haru Kobayashi
 Ballad of Orin (1977 film)
 Ichi (2008 film)

Notes

References 

 Fritsch, Ingrid. “The Sociological Significance of Historically Unreliable Documents in the Case of Japanese Musical Guilds,” in Tokumaru Yosihiko, et al. eds, Tradition and its Future in Music. Report of SIMS 1990 Ōsaka, pp. 147–52. Tokyo and Osaka: Mita Press. 
 Fritsch, Ingrid. “Blind Female Musicians on the Road: The Social Organization of ‘Goze’ in Japan,” Chime Journal, 5 (Spring) 1992: pp. 58–64.
 Fritsch, Ingrid. Japans Blinde Sänger im Schutz der Gottheit Myōon-Benzaiten. München: Iudicium, 1996, pp. 198–231.
 
 Groemer, Gerald. Goze: Women, Musical Performance, and Visual Disability in Traditional Japan.  New York: Oxford University Press, 2016. 
 Groemer, Gerald. Goze to goze-uta no kenkyū　(瞽女と瞽女唄の研究). Nagoya: University of Nagoya Press (Nagoya Daigaku Shuppankai), 2007. Vol. 1: Research; vol. 2: Historical materials.
 Harich-Schneider, Eta. “Regional Folk Songs and Itinerant Minstrels in Japan,” Journal of the American Musicological Society, no. 10 (1957), pp. 132–3.
 Harich-Schneider, Eta. “The Last Remnants of a Mendicant Musicians Guild: The Goze in Northern Honshū (Japan).” Journal of the International Folk Music Council, 11 (1959): 56–59.

 Katō, Yasuaki (加藤康昭). Nihon mōjin shakai-shi kenkyū (日本盲人社会史研究). Miraisha, 1974.
 Saitō, Shin’ichi (斎藤真一).  Goze: mōmoku no tabi geinin　(瞽女 盲目の旅芸人). Nippon Hōsō Shuppan Kyōkai, 1972.
 Saitō, Shin’ichi. Echigo goze nikki　(越後瞽女日記). Kawade Shobō Shinsha, 1972.
 Sakuma, Jun’ichi (佐久間淳一). Agakita goze to goze-uta shū　(阿賀北瞽女と瞽女唄集). Shibata-shi: Shibata-shi Bunkazai Chōsa Shingikai, 1975.
 Sakuma, Jun’ichi. "Goze no minzoku" (瞽女の民俗) (Minzoku mingei sōsho, vol. 91). Iwasaki Bijutsu-sha, 1986.
 Suzuki, Shōei　(鈴木昭英). Goze: shinkō to geinō　(瞽女　信仰と芸能). Koshi Shōin, 1996.
 Suzuki, Shōei, et al., eds. Ihira Take kikigaki: Echigo no goze　(伊平タケ聞き書　越後の瞽女). Kōdansha, 1976.

External links 
 Musizierende Frauengemeinschaften in Japan - Beobachtungen von Studenten der musikwissenschaftlichen Genderforschung an der Universität Paderborn und der Hochschule für Musik Detmold 
 A video of three  on the road; broadcast in 1971, probably filmed earlier. 

Japanese women musicians
Japanese musicians
Japanese traditional music
Japanese words and phrases
Shamisen players
Japanese blind people
Blind musicians